Lockalloy is an alloy that consists of 62% beryllium and 38% aluminum. It was used as a structural metal in the aerospace industry because of its high specific strength and stiffness. The alloy was first developed in the 1960s by the Lockheed Missiles and Space Company. The material was used in the Lockheed YF12 and LGM-30 Minuteman missile systems. In the 1970s production difficulties limited the material to a few specialized uses and by the mid 1970s Lockalloy was no longer commercially available.

In 1990, Materion Beryllium & Composites re-introduced the material into the commercial marketplace as a powder-sintered composite under the trade name of AlBeMet.

References

Beryllium alloys